The second season of the family sitcom Full House originally aired on ABC between October 14, 1988 and May 5, 1989. From this season onward, Mary-Kate and Ashley Olsen are credited in the opening credits.

Plot
In season two, Danny is fired from his job as a sportscaster and instead is promoted to a higher position as the host of a morning talk show titled Wake Up San Francisco, earning him a co-host named Rebecca Donaldson (Lori Loughlin) and Jesse's potential love interest. Meanwhile, Jesse and Joey become best friends (much to Danny's jealousy) and start doing advertising jingles together. D. J. begins sixth grade and Stephanie enters first grade.

Main cast 

 John Stamos as Jesse Katsopolis
 Bob Saget as Danny Tanner 
 Dave Coulier as Joey Gladstone
 Candace Cameron as D. J. Tanner
 Jodie Sweetin as Stephanie Tanner
 Mary-Kate and Ashley Olsen as Michelle Tanner

Episodes

See also 
 List of Full House episodes

References 

General references 
 
 

1988 American television seasons
1989 American television seasons
2